The Grundwasser, also called Grundbach or Hinteres Wasser, is a small stream of Upper Lusatia in Germany. It is a left tributary of the Landwasser, which it joins near Oderwitz. It has a length of about three miles and flows through the villages Eibau and Oderwitz.

See also
 List of rivers of Saxony

Rivers of Saxony
Upper Lusatia
Rivers of Germany